AN codes are error-correcting code that are used in arithmetic applications.  Arithmetic codes were commonly used in computer processors to ensure the accuracy of its arithmetic operations when electronics were more unreliable.  Arithmetic codes help the processor to detect when an error is made and correct it.  Without these codes, processors would be unreliable since any errors would go undetected.  AN codes are arithmetic codes that are named for the integers  and  that are used to encode and decode the codewords.

These codes differ from most other codes in that they use arithmetic weight to maximize the arithmetic distance between codewords as opposed to the hamming weight and hamming distance.  The arithmetic distance between two words is a measure of the number of errors made while computing an arithmetic operation.  Using the arithmetic distance is necessary since one error in an arithmetic operation can cause a large hamming distance between the received answer and the correct answer.

Arithmetic Weight and Distance
The arithmetic weight of an integer  in base  is defined by

 

Removing all the terms where  will simulate a  equal to its hamming weight. This is a quick upper bound on the arithmetic weight since .

The arithmetic distance between two integers is defined by

 

This is one of the primary metrics used when analyzing arithmetic codes.

AN Codes

<

Each choice of  will result in a different code, while  serves as a limiting factor to ensure useful properties in the distance of the code. If  is too large, it could let a codeword with a very small arithmetic weight into the code which will degrade the distance of the entire code. Let the result of the operation on the codewords be . To decode, simply divide . As with codes using hamming distance, AN codes can correct up to  errors where  is the distance of the code.

This results in the operation . Then, to find the solution we divide . As long as >, this will be a possible operation under the code. Notice that since , the hamming weight between the received word and the correct solution is  after just  errors. To correct this error, an algorithm would be used to compute the nearest codeword to the received word in terms of arithmetic distance. We will not describe the algorithms in detail.

To ensure that the distance of the code will not be too small, we will define modular AN codes.

where  and <<, . Then the modular distance between two words is the length of the shortest path between their nodes in the graph.

Choosing  also tends to result in codes with larger distances than other codes.

A cyclic AN code is a principal ideal of the ring .  There are integers  and  where  and  satisfy the definition of an AN code.  Cyclic AN codes are a subset of cyclic codes and have the same properties.

Mandelbaum-Barrows Codes

The Mandelbaum-Barrows Codes are a type of cyclic AN codes introduced by D. Mandelbaum and J. T. Barrows. For example, choosing , and  the result will be a Mandelbaum-Barrows Code such that < in base .

To analyze the distance of the Mandelbaum-Barrows Codes, we will need the following theorem.

theorem: Let  be a cyclic AN code with generator , and

Then,

proof: Assume that each  has a unique cyclic NAF representation which is

This matrix is essentially a list of all the codewords in  where each column is a codeword. Since  is cyclic, each column of the matrix has the same number of zeros. Since  with <, then <.

We will now use the previous theorem to show that the Mandelbaum-Barrows Codes are equidistant (which means that every pair of codewords have the same distance), with a distance of

This implies there . Then . Since all codewords have the same weight, and by the previous theorem we know the total weight of all codewords, the distance of the code is found by dividing the total weight by the number of codewords (excluding 0).

See also
Error detection and correction
Forward Error Correction

References

Error detection and correction